Harding is a surname of Anglo-Saxon English origin. Notable people with the surname include:

Real people
Aaron Harding (1805–1875), American politician
Abi Harding, English saxophonist
Abner C. Harding (1807–1874), American politician
Alan Harding (born 1948), English footballer
Albert Austin Harding (1880–1958), First Director of Bands at the University of Illinois
Anita Harding (1952–1995), British neurologist
Ann Harding (1901–1981), American actress
Antony Harding (fl. c. 2000), English singer
Arthur Harding (1878–1947), Wales and British Isles rugby union international player
Austie Harding (1917–1991), ice hockey player
Baron Harding of Petherton, English peerage
Ben Harding (born 1984), English footballer
Ben Harding (guitarist)
Benjamin F. Harding (1823–1899), American politician
Brent Harding (born 1967), bass player
Buster Harding (1912–1965), Canadian jazz pianist
C. B. Harding, American film director
Charles R. Harding (c.1866 – ?), aka 'Wag' Harding, English champion sculler
Chester Harding (disambiguation)
Çiğdem Balım Harding, American academic
Clare Harding (1895–1973), English horsewoman
, Australian artist, subject of a 2019 exhibition at the Institute of Modern Art, Brisbane
Dan Harding (born 1983), English footballer
Daniel Harding (born 1975), British conductor
David Harding (disambiguation)
Donald Harding, American serial robber and spree killer
Douglas Harding (1909–2007), English mystic and author
Duncan Harding (1926–2007), pseudonym of Charles Whiting
Edwin F. Harding (1886–1970), military commander
Elizabeth Ya Eli Harding, Gambian diplomat
Eric Harding (born 1972), American boxer
Francis Pym Harding (1821–1875), English army general
Florence Harding (1860–1924), First Lady of the United States
Georg Harding (born 1981), Australian rules footballer
George Frederick Harding  (1858–1927), Wales international rugby union player
George M. Harding (1827–1910), American architect
George Harding, 8th Baron Berkeley (1601–1658), seventeenth-century English nobleman
Gilbert Harding (1907–1960), British journalist
Greg Harding (born 1976), Australian rules footballer
Harding of Bristol (c. 1048 – c. 1125), son of Eadnoth the Constable
Harold Harding (1900–1986), British civil engineer
Harry Harding (disambiguation)
Ian Harding (born 1986), American actor
Israel Harding (1833–1917), English recipient of the Victoria Cross
Jack Harding (1898–1963), American football coach
Jack Harding (hurler) (1933–2020), Irish hurler
Jaime Harding, English pop singer
James Harding (disambiguation)
Jamie Harding (born 1979), English actor
Jeff Harding (disambiguation)
Jesper Harding (1799–1865), American publisher
John Harding (disambiguation)
Joseph Harding (1805–1876), English cheesemaker
Josh Harding (born 1984), Canadian ice hockey player
June Harding (1940–2019), American actress
Karl Ludwig Harding (1765–1834), German astronomer
Keith Harding (born 1938), Scottish politician
Kenneth R. Harding (1914–2007), American politician
Laverne Harding (1905–1984), American animator
Lee Harding (born 1983), Australian singer
Lee Harding (writer) (born 1937), Australian writer
Leigh Harding (born 1981), Australian rules footballer
Lindsey Harding (born 1984), American basketball player
Lyn Harding (1867–1952), Welsh actor who appeared in British made silent films, talkies and radio
Major B. Harding (born 1935), American attorney
Mark Hardinges (born 1978), English cricketer
Maria Harding, Canadian mayor
Mary Esther Harding (1888–1971), American Jungian analyst
Matt Harding (born 1976), computer game designer
Matt Harding (musician) (born 1975), British musician
Matthew Harding (1953–1996), British businessman
Meg Harding (born 1945), American politician from Missouri
Michael Harding  (born 1953), Irish writer
Mike Harding (born 1944), English comedian and singer
Natasha Harding (born 1989), Welsh association football player
Nicholas Harding (1956–2022), Australian artist
Nicholas Mark Harding (born 1964), English writer
Oswald Harding (born 1935), Jamaican politician
Paul Harding (disambiguation)
Peter Harding (disambiguation)
Phil Harding (disambiguation)
Phyllis Harding (1907–1992), English swimmer
Prince Harding, Sierra Leone politician
Ralph R. Harding (1929–2006), Idaho congressman
Randolph Harding (1914–1996), Canadian politician
Reggie Harding (1942–1972), American basketball player
Richard Harding, English rugby union player
Rodney Harding (born 1962), Canadian American-football player
Ross Harding (1948–2006), pseudonym of David Gemmell
Rowe Harding (1901–1991), Welsh rugby union player
Ryan Harding (born 1984), Scottish soccer player
Sam Harding (rugby union) (born 1980), New Zealand rugby union footballer
Sam Harding (athlete) (born 1991), Australian Paralympic athlete
Samuel Harding (American football) (1873–1919), American football coach
Sandra Harding (born 1935), American philosopher
Sarah Harding (1981–2021), member of the British group Girls Aloud
Lama Sarah Harding, Buddhist teacher and translator
Seth Harding (1734–1814), officer in the US Navy
Stephen Harding (died 1134), Christian saint
Stephen Harding (cricketer), English cricketer of the mid-18th century
Stephen S. Harding (1808–1891), Utah politician
Ted Harding (1921–2004), Australian politician
Theo Harding (1860–1919), Wales rugby union player
Tim Harding (musician) (born 1978), Australian entertainer
Tim Harding (chess player) (born 1948)
Tanya Harding (born 1972), Australian softball player
Thomas Harding (1448–1532), 16th-century religious dissident
Tony Harding (1942–2014), British illustrator
Tonya Harding (born 1970), American figure skater
Traci Harding, Australian novelist
Trevor Harding (speedway rider) (born 1986), Australian speedway rider
Trevor Harding (politician), Canadian politician
Valerie Campbell-Harding (1932–2006), Canadian textile designer
Vanessa Harding (born 1970), American wrestler
Vic Harding (1952–1979), English speedway rider
Vincent Harding (1931–2014), African-American historian
Walter Harding (1917–1996), American academic
Warren Harding (climber) (1924–2002)
Warren G. Harding (1865–1923), 29th president of the United States
Weylan Harding (born 1972), American football coach
William Harding (disambiguation)
Zay Harding (born 1974), American television personality and actor

Fictional characters
Ace Harding, a character in Deja Vue video game
Cyrus Harding, a fictional character created by Jule Verne
Dale Harding, a character in One Flew Over the Cuckoo's Nest
Leyla Harding, a fictional character in British soap Emmerdale
Tess Harding, a fictional character created by Jason Katims

English-language surnames